Kalfa (Turkish for 'apprentice, assistant master') was a general term in the Ottoman Empire for the women attendants and supervisors in service in the imperial palace.
The titles  and  belong to the terminology of Ottoman guild organization and other hierarchically-organized corporate bodies. Legally slave girls, these women—depending on their rank—could wield considerable authority and influence in their duties and were generally treated with much respect by lower-ranking attendants in the harem as well as by members of the imperial family. 

Among craftsmen the term had a similar rank: that of a junior master yet to graduate to  status and open his own shop.

Imperial kalfas
The kalfas in personal service to the monarch were called  (Turkish for 'Imperial Kalfas'). The  (Turkish for 'treasurer') were the high-ranking chamberlain kalfas charged with supervisory duties in the harem. Their head, the hazinedar usta or high , occupied the second highest position in harem service, immediately below the lady steward.

Notable kalfas
Notable women traditionally addressed as kalfas include Cevri Kalfa, a slave girl who saved Sultan Mahmud II's life and was awarded for her bravery and loyalty and appointed , the chief treasurer of the Imperial Harem, which was the second-most important position in the hierarchy.

The wives of many sultans were kalfas before their marriages.

References

Ottoman titles
Ottoman imperial harem
Slaves from the Ottoman Empire
Ottoman slave trade
Concubines of the Ottoman Empire
Ladies-in-waiting of the Ottoman Empire
House slaves